The Palawan bearcat (Arctictis binturong whitei), also commonly known as the Palawan binturong, is a subspecies of the binturong, a mammal in the family Viverridae. It is endemic to the island of Palawan in the Philippines.

Description
Distinguishing characteristics are the ears that are lined with white fur, and long, white whiskers that can be as long as the length of its head. Generally docile when handled, the bearcat nevertheless has sharp claws and teeth that can easily rip through flesh. It can suspend itself by curling its strong prehensile tail around branches. Its vertically oriented pupil indicates that it is a nocturnal animal. It has coarse, thick black-brown fur.

Biology
The Palawan binturong inhabits tropical rainforest habitat. It is an omnivore, feeding on fruit, small animals, and carrion. 

These animals are generally arboreal, living in woods, including rainforests, as well as agricultural areas and human settlements. They are omnivores, eating a wide range of fruits, insects, small mammals, and birds.

Binturongs in Palawan are solitary creatures that are active at night. They communicate with one another by a range of vocalizations like as grunts, hisses, and growls.

These animals have a modest reproductive rate and give birth to a single youngster following a 90-day gestation period. For the first few months of their lives, the young are born with their eyes closed and utterly reliant on their mother.

Conservation
Due to its limited distribution, the Palawan binturong may be of conservation concern, and because of its reliance on the forest, it is threatened by deforestation, which is a severe problem in Palawan: Between 2000 and 2017, 11% of the world's forest was lost. Furthermore, Palawan is a hub for illegal wildlife trade, with Palawan binturongs being seized on a regular basis (The IUCN lists the Palawan binturong as Vulnerable; the main threats it faces are destruction and degradation of primary rainforest, hunting for meat, use in traditional medicines and as pets, and accidental or intentional snaring, which is exacerbated by negligible penalties for hunting and trade in some countries. They, like ordinary palm civets (Paradoxurus spp.), are live-trapped and kept in farms in Indonesia for the manufacture of civet coffee, with poor living conditions leading in significant mortality. This subspecies is harvested for the pet trade. In the south of its range it is also taken for human consumption.

References 

Mammals of the Philippines
Endemic fauna of the Philippines
Fauna of Palawan
Viverrids